Anderson Lake State Park is a public recreation area on the Quimper Peninsula in Jefferson County, Washington. The state park has  of woods and wetland that slope down to  Anderson Lake. The park offers picnicking, trails for hiking, biking, and equestrian use, non-motorized boating, fishing, and birdwatching. The presence of toxic algae forbids water use of any kind from time to time.

References

External links

Anderson Lake State Park Washington State Parks and Recreation Commission 
Anderson Lake State Park Map Washington State Parks and Recreation Commission

Parks in Jefferson County, Washington
State parks of Washington (state)
Protected areas established in 1969
1969 establishments in Washington (state)